Renato Marcos Endrizzi Sabbatini (born 20 February 1947, Campinas) is a retired professor at the Department of Biomedical Engineering and at the State University of Campinas Institute of Biology. He received a B.Sc. in Biomedical Sciences from Medical School of the University of São Paulo and a doctorate in behavioral neuroscience in 1977, followed by postdoctoral work at the Max Planck Institute of Psychiatry's Primate Behavior Department. He founded the Center for Biomedical Informatics,
and helped create the Brazilian Society for Health Informatics.

Sabbatini received the 1992 Prêmio José Reis de Divulgação Científica award for popular science writing,
and was named one of Info Exame Magazine's "50 Champions of Innovation" for 2007. He is currently president of the Edumed Institute for Education in Medicine and Health, a "not-for-profit educational, research and development institution."

Professor Sabbatini is a Fellow Elect (Inaugural Class) of the International Academy of Health Sciences Informatics, established by the International Medical Informatics Association (IMIA), and a Fellow Elect of the American College of Medical Informatics, established by the American Medical Informatics Association.

Selected publications
 Sabbatini, R.M.E.: A multilayered neural network for processing 2D tomographic images in neurosurgery. Proceed. Nuclear Science Symposium and Medical Imaging Conference, IEEE, 1992
 Ortiz J., Ghefter C.G., Silva C.E., Sabbatini R.M.E.: One-year mortality prognosis in heart failure: a neural network approach based on echocardiographic data. J Am Coll Cardiol. 1995 Dec;26(7):1586–93.  
 Sabbatini, R.M.E.; Cardoso, S.H.: The Virtual Hospital, Electronic Publications and the Visible Human: New Paradigms for Health Education. Proceed. Regional Conference on Health Information Systems, p. 128–137, São Paulo, BIREME, 1996. (In Portuguese)
 Sabbatini, R.M.E.: Using neural networks for processing biologic signals. MD Comput. 1996 Mar–Apr;13(2):165–172. 
 Da Costa, C.G.A. & Sabbatini, R.M.E.: A Survey of Software Engineering Practices in the Development of Electronic Patient Record Systems. Proceed. AMIA Annu. Meet.
 Cardoso, S.H.; Sabbatini, R.M.E.: "Brain & Mind" Magazine: An On-Line Multimedia Resource for Dissemination and Evaluation of Knowledge in Neuroscience. Proceed. AMIA Annu. Meet. (In PDF)
 Carvalho, P.M.; Sabbatini, R.M.E. Integrating the Teaching of Informatics to Medical Students in a Problem-Based Learning Undergraduate Course. Proceed. AMIA Annu. Meet.
 Botelho, M.L.; Araújo, L.; Sabbatini, R.M.E.: A Neural-Network Based System on the World Wide Web for Prognosis and Indication of Surgery in Head and Brain Trauma. Proceed. AMIA Annu. Meet., 1997 (In PDF)
 Quaresma, R.P.; Sabbatini, R.M.E.; Cardoso, S.H.; Ortale, J.R.: Adding Java and CGI Functionality to an On-Line Atlas of Anatomy for Medical Education. Proceed. AMIA Annu. Meet., 1997 (In PDF)
 Palombo, C.R. Maccari-Filho, M.; Sabbatini, R.M.E. and Halstead, C.L.: The Virtual Dental Center: Resource for Research and Education on the WWW. Proceed. AMIA Annu. Meet., 1997 (In PDF)
 Sabbatini, R.M.E.; Cardoso, S.H.: Interdisciplinarity and the Neurosciences. Interdisciplinary Science Reviews, 27(4) Dec 2002, pp. 303–311.
 Sabbatini, R.M.E.; Cardoso, S.H.: Internet-2 Based Tele/Videoconferencing for Distance Medical Education: The EduMed. Net Project. AMIA Annual Meeting
 Cardoso, S.H.; Sabbatini, R.M.E.: On-line Resources for a WWW-based Continued Education Curriculum on Behavioral Neurobiology. AMIA Annual Meeting (in PDF).
 Sabbatini, R.M.E.: The Brazilian Virtual Hospital. A Case in e-Health. In: Knight, P. et al.: e-Democracy in Brazil. Rio de Janeiro: Pearson Educational, 2003. (In Portuguese).
 Sabbatini, R.M.E. & Cardoso, S.H.: A Distance Interactive Course on the History of Neuroscience. Abstr. Annu. Meet. Soc. Neurosci. (SFN 2003), New Orleans, LA, USA, Nov. 2003.
 Lopes da Silva, J.V.; Santa Bárbara, A.; Cardoso, S.H.; Sabbatini, R.M.E. and Coimbra, N.C.: Construction of 3D Anatomical Models in Polymer Using Selective Laser Sintering – A New Method for Teaching Human Anatomy, Proc. VIII International Conference on Nursing Informatics. Rio de Janeiro, June 2003.
 Sabbatini, R.M.E. Internet Health Applications in Brazil. In: Sosa-Iudicissa, M. et al. (Eds). Internet, Telematics and Health. IOP Press, 1997. Excerpt at Google Books
 Sabbatini, R.M.E. – Applications of connectionist systems in Biomedicine. In: Lun, K.C.; Degoulet, P. & Piemme, T. (Eds.) – Proceed. 7th World Congress on Medical Informatics (MEDINFO 92). p. 418–425, 1992.
 Sabbatini RM. A head-mounted stereotaxic platform with movable electrodes for intracerebral exploration. Braz J Med Biol Res. 1982 Apr;15(1):65–71.

References

External links
 Personal website (In English and Portuguese)

Brazilian physiologists
Brazilian computer scientists
Brazilian neuroscientists
Brazilian businesspeople
Brazilian science writers
Brazilian agnostics
Brazilian skeptics
People from Campinas
Brazilian people of Italian descent
Health informaticians
1947 births
Living people
University of São Paulo alumni
People associated with the State University of Campinas